Dashabatar Cards is a card game of West Bengal. It first originated in Bishnupur, the town of Bankura District. In the 16th century, Bir Hambir, the king of Bishnupur, invented this card. There are ten avatars of Bishnu in the cards. It is a unique example of Bengal’s folk art.

Origin 
In 1592, Bir Hambir became king of Bishnupur. He had a great relationship with Akbar, so, a lot of times he went to Akbar's court. Seeing the playing of cards he was surprised. Coming to his kingdom, he thought of creating a new card in God-goddess of uniqueness. According to his directive, artist from Bishnupur, Kartik Faujdar, made the Dashabatar Cards. kings of Mallabhum play this card at leisure for entertaining. 

However, Indian scholar Haraprasad Shastri said that this game first originated in the 8th century. In 1895 he said in the Asiatic society's journal:
...I fully believe that the game was invented about eleven or twelve hundred years before the present date.

Because the placement of Jagannath (Buddha) is in the 5th position in Dashabatar card, but in common belief, Jagannath is in the 9th position.

Prabhat Kumar Saha, an expert on Dashavatar cards, said: "Malla dynasty ruled from about 12th century AD to 1622". He confirmed that the Foujdars were the only makers of these cards in Bengal.

Method 
The artists from the Faujdar family of Bishnupur specialise in making these cards. At first, a piece of cloth is folded a number of times. Then glue is pasted, made from tamarind seeds. After drying this, a layer of chalk dust is applied on the cards. Both sides are evened out with a smooth stone. The cards are then cut into round shapes of a 4.5-inch radius. Various deities and their symbols are painted on these using various colours. On the reverse part, a layer of lac and vermillion is applied.

Cards 
Dashavatar cards are the 10 avatars of Lord Vishnu - Matsya, Kurma, Baraha, Nrisingha, Buddha (Jagannath), Baaman, Ram, Balaram, Parshuram and Kalki are drawn on these cards. 

The Dashavatar card game is a complicated one. It is played using 120 cards with numerous rules and regulations. 

Sital Fouzdar claims to be the 87th generation of artisans. Nowadays, Vidyut Fouzdar makes them.

See also
 Bishnupur's Dasavatar Taash published in festival'18 of The Statesman

See also

 Ganjifa

References

Indian card games
Indian handicrafts
Arts in India